Gonna Ball is the second studio album by American rockabilly band Stray Cats, first released in the UK by Arista Records in November 1981. The album was produced by the band and Hein Hoven. It went platinum in the U.K.

Five of the album's tracks ("Baby Blue Eyes", "Little Miss Prissy", "You Don't Believe Me", "Rev It Up and Go" and "Lonely Summer Nights") were later included on the band's first American album, Built for Speed (1982). Only "You Don't Believe Me" charted in the UK, reaching #57.

Track listing
All tracks composed by Brian Setzer; except where indicated
"Baby Blue Eyes" (Johnny Burnette, Paul Burlison)
"Little Miss Prissy"
"Wasn't That Good" (Wynonie Harris)
"Cryin' Shame"
"(She'll Stay Just) One More Day" (Slim Jim Phantom, Lee Rocker)
"What's Goin' Down (Cross That Bridge)"
"You Don't Believe Me" (Setzer, Lee Rocker)
"Gonna Ball" (Allen Bunn)
"Wicked Whisky"
"Rev It Up and Go"
"Lonely Summer Nights"
"Crazy Mixed-Up Kid"

Personnel
Stray Cats
Brian Setzer - guitar, vocals
Lee Rocker - bass, vocals
Slim Jim Phantom - drums, vocals

Additional personnel
John Locke - keyboards
Steve Poncar - saxophone
Ian Stewart - keyboards
Brian McDonald - harmonica
Lee Allen - tenor saxophone
Gavin Cochrane - photography

Charts

References

1981 albums
Stray Cats albums
EMI America Records albums